Symbols of Sussex are the objects, images or cultural expressions that are emblematic, representative or otherwise characteristic of Sussex or Sussex culture. As a rule, these symbols are cultural icons that have emerged from Sussex folklore and tradition, meaning few have any official status. However, most if not all maintain recognition at a county or national level, and some, such as the emblem of Sussex, have been codified in heraldry, and are established, official and recognised symbols of Sussex.

Flag

Heraldry

Flora

Other symbols

See also
Cornish symbols
Symbols of England
Symbols of the United Kingdom

References

Bibliography 

Sussex
Culture in Sussex